Antoine Nduwayo (born 1942) was the Prime Minister of Burundi from February 22, 1995, until July 31, 1996. He is an ethnic Tutsi and a member of UPRONA. He was appointed prime minister by the Hutu president in an effort to stop some Tutsis from fighting with his government. He resigned shortly after the 1996 military coup.

Opened in October 2019, the trial on the assassination of the first democratically elected Hutu president, Melchior Ndadaye delivered it's verdict on October 19, 2020, more than a year after its opening and two days before the anniversary of the assassination.

Nduwayo, as well as the former president of Burundi, Pierre Buyoya, and fifteen other defendants, were sentenced to life imprisonment for "an attack on the Head of State, an attack on the authority of the State and an attempt to bring massacre and devastation ”and to a fine of 102 billion Burundian francs. Three other defendants were sentenced to 20 years in prison. Nduwayo was the only accused to be acquitted by Burundian justice.

References

Living people
1942 births
Union for National Progress politicians
Prime Ministers of Burundi
Tutsi people